Joint Approximation Diagonalization of Eigen-matrices (JADE) is an algorithm for independent component analysis that separates observed mixed signals into latent source signals by exploiting fourth order moments. The fourth order moments are a measure of non-Gaussianity, which is used as a proxy for defining independence between the source signals. The motivation for this measure is that Gaussian distributions possess zero excess kurtosis, and with non-Gaussianity being a canonical assumption of ICA, JADE seeks an orthogonal rotation of the observed mixed vectors to estimate source vectors which possess high values of excess kurtosis.

Algorithm 
Let  denote an observed data matrix whose  columns correspond to observations of -variate mixed vectors. It is assumed that  is prewhitened, that is, its rows have a sample mean equaling zero and a sample covariance is the  dimensional identity matrix, that is,

Applying JADE to  entails
 optimizing a contrast function to obtain a  rotation matrix 
to estimate the source components given by the rows of the  dimensional matrix .

References

Computational statistics